Félix Modesto Conde Falcón (February 28, 1938 – April 4, 1969) was a United States Army soldier and a recipient of the Medal of Honor. Born in Juncos, Puerto Rico, he joined the United States Army in April 1963 in Chicago, Illinois. He was killed during combat operations in Ap Tan Hoa, South Vietnam, on April 4, 1969. He was posthumously awarded the Medal of Honor by President Barack Obama in a March 18, 2014 ceremony in the White House. The award comes through the Defense Authorization Act which called for a review of Jewish American and Hispanic American veterans from World War II, the Korean War and the Vietnam War to ensure that no prejudice was shown to those deserving the Medal of Honor.

Military awards
Conde Falcón's military decorations include the following:

Badges
 Expert Rifle Marksmanship Badge 
 Marksmanship Badge
  Drill Sergeant Identification Badge
 1 Overseas Service Bar

Medal of Honor citation

See also

List of Puerto Ricans
List of Puerto Rican military personnel
List of Puerto Rican recipients of the Medal of Honor
List of Hispanic Medal of Honor recipients
List of Medal of Honor recipients for the Vietnam War
Puerto Ricans in the Vietnam War
Historic Feats
Staff Sergeant Conde-Falcon and his company encountered an extensive enemy bunker complex, later identified as a battalion command post. Following tactical artillery and air strikes on the heavily-secured enemy position, Staff Sergeant Conde-Falcon’s platoon was selected to assault and clear the bunker fortifications. Moving out ahead of his platoon, Staff Sergeant Conde-Falcon charged the first bunker, heaving grenades as he went. As the hostile fire increased, he crawled to the blind side of an entrenchment position, jumped to the roof, and tossed a grenade into the bunker aperture. Without hesitating, he proceeded to two additional bunkers, both of which he destroyed in the same manner as the first. Rejoining his platoon, Staff Sergeant Conde-Falcon advanced about one hundred meters through the trees before coming under intense hostile fire. Selecting three men to accompany him, he maneuvered toward the enemy’s flank position. Carrying a machinegun, he single-handedly assaulted the nearest fortification, killing the enemy inside before running out of ammunition. After returning to the three men with his empty weapon and taking up an M-16 rifle, he concentrated on the next bunker. Within ten meters of his goal, Staff Sergeant Conde-Falcon was shot by an unseen assailant and soon died of his wounds.

Notes

References

1938 births
1969 deaths
People from Juncos, Puerto Rico
Puerto Rican Army personnel
United States Army non-commissioned officers
United States Army personnel of the Vietnam War
American military personnel killed in the Vietnam War
Puerto Rican recipients of the Medal of Honor
United States Army Medal of Honor recipients
Vietnam War recipients of the Medal of Honor